Catherine Rouvel (born Catherine Vitale; 31 August 1939 in Marseille) is an acclaimed French actress. Her career spans from 1959 in television to 2004.

She starred in Jean Renoir's Le Déjeuner sur l'herbe, Marcel Carné's Les Assassins de l'ordre and in the 1976 Jean-Jacques Annaud film Black and White in Color.

Selected filmography 
 1959 : Picnic on the Grass by Jean Renoir : Nénette
 1963 : Chair de poule by Julien Duvivier : Maria
 1964 : Les Pas perdus
 1968 : Benjamin
 1970 : Borsalino by Jacques Deray : Lola.
 1970 : The Breach by Claude Chabrol : Sonia
 1971 : I Miss Sonja Henie
 1971 : Les Assassins de l'ordre by Marcel Carné
 1971 : Le Soldat Laforêt by Guy Cavagnac : Diane
 1973 : Les Volets clos by Jean-Claude Brialy : Flora
 1974 : The Marseille Contract
 1974 : Borsalino & Co.
 1976 : Noirs et blancs en couleur by Jean-Jacques Annaud : Marinette
 1986 : Jubiabá by Nelson Pereira dos Santos: Amélia
 1987 : Blood and Sand
 1995 : Élisa by Jean Becker :
 2011 : En enkel till Antibes by Richard Hobert (director)

Television 
 1972: Les Rois maudits, French miniseries directed by Claude Barma: Béatrice d'Hirson
 1972: Clochemerle, BBC TV miniseries: Judith Toumignon

References

External links
 
 
  Site officiel de Catherine Rouvel

French film actresses
French television actresses
1939 births
Living people
20th-century French actresses
Actresses from Marseille